Edgar Nicolás Ramírez Ceceña (born February 16, 1974, in Tepic) is a Mexican former footballer who played as a defensive midfielder.

He started his career playing for Santos Laguna in 1993–94. By the Invierno 1996 season, Ramírez had become a starter in a championship-winning squad that also included Benjamín Galindo, Jared Borgetti, and Gabriel Caballero. Though Ramírez retained his place in defensive midfield in the following seasons, Santos experienced declining results and he transferred to Cruz Azul in 1999. He eventually represented ten different clubs, playing his final match in the top division with Atlas in 2005.

Ramírez also represented Mexico, making 19 international appearances. His first match came at the 1997 U.S. Cup against Denmark on January 17, 1997, a 3–1 victory in San Diego. Although he appeared in several qualifying matches and played all six games at the 1997 Copa America, he was not called up for the 1998 FIFA World Cup. He will also be remembered for his own goal in a World Cup qualifier against the United States on April 20, 1997, in Foxboro, Massachusetts, a match that ended in a 2–2 draw. His last international match occurred in Los Angeles on November 18, 1998, against Guatemala.

He is the brother of the famous international player Ramón Ramírez.

References

External links

1974 births
Living people
Sportspeople from Tepic, Nayarit
Mexico international footballers
Association football midfielders
Liga MX players
Club América footballers
Club León footballers
C.F. Pachuca players
Club Puebla players
Santos Laguna footballers
Club Celaya footballers
Atlas F.C. footballers
Toros Neza footballers
Atlético Morelia players
Mexican footballers